The thirteenth season of Akademi Fantasia, also branded as AF2016, premiered on 21 August 2016 and concluded on 9 October 2016 on the Astro Ria television channel. Zizan Razak returned as host along with his new partner, Alif Satar, while Ramli M.S. continued to judge and AC Mizal joined the judging panel following the departure of Rozita Che Wan.

The professional trainers for this season were announced in a press conference for media, which include trainers from previous season, Linda Jasmine, Shahrol, Mas Idayu and Ellie Suriati. AF2015 principal Edry Abdul Halim returned as Music Director, while Shake was announced as the new principal for this season.

On 9 October 2016, Amir Syazwan Masdi was announced as the season's winner, beating Muhammad Ammal Shafiq Osman.

Audition
AF2016 Audition Requirements (Open)
The competition is open to all Malaysians and Singaporeans aged between 18 - 35 years on 1 June 2016. - Participants must be Malaysian and Singaporean citizens and must have an Identity Card (NRIC) or Singapore Identity Card and/or passport. - One copy of Malaysian Identity Card, for Malaysian participants and Singapore Identity Card and/or Singapore Passport for Singapore participants - Two recent 4R size photographs (1 half body, 1 full photograph) from the participant; - One recent passport photo of the participant - Open for Solo performances only.

 

List of AF2016 Audition Songs Male Participants
 Love Yourself (Justin Bieber)
 Hidup dalam Mati (Syamel)
 Dahsyat (Mojo)
 Cinta Tak Keruan (Amigos)
 Pantun Budi (Tan Sri SM Salim)
 Sudah Ku Tahu (Projector Band)
 Sampai Mati (Hazama)
 Potret (Akim & The Majistret)
 Pawana (Search)
 Memori Berkasih (Achik Spin & Siti Nordiana)

 

List of AF2016 Audition Songs Female Participants
 Flashlight (Jessie J)
 Anggapanmu (Ziana Zain)
 Langit Cinta (Dayang Nurfaizah)
 Sakitnya Tu Disini (Cita-Citata)
 Joget Sayang Di Sayang (Anita Sarawak)
 Not For Sale (Stacy)
 Seluruh Cinta (Dato' Siti Nurhaliza)
 Pencuri Hati (Ayda Jebat)
 Permata Pemotong Permata (Ella)
 Memori Berkasih (Achik Spin & Siti Nordiana)

 

AF2016 Audition Location 
15 – 17 Julai 2016
 The Boulevard – St Giles Premier Hotel, Mid Valley Kuala Lumpur

Students
Ages stated are at time of contest.

Concert summaries

Week 1
 Aired date: 21 August 2016 
 Theme: Student's Choice 
 Guest judges: -
 
 Eliminated: No elimination.

Week 2
 Aired date: 28 August 2016
 Theme: Throwback
 Guest judges: Juliza Adzlizan

 Eliminated: Azarul Rais bin Mansur (Rais), Mohammad Fara Aidid bin Ali Dad Khan (Isa) & Halmy bin Hamizan (Halmy)

Week 3
 Aired date: 4 September 2016
 Theme: Rock & Etnic
 Guest judges: Awie
 
 Eliminated: No elimination.
 JoHaRa Rockstar: Zahrul Hilmi bin Badrul Hisam (Emy) 
Emy was announced as a student absorbed into the Akademi Fantasia. Emy is the winner of the JoHaRa Rockstar karaoke competition on Era FM.

Week 4
 Aired date: 11 September 2016 
 Guest judges: Adibah Noor
{| border="8" cellpadding="4" cellspacing="0" style="margin:  1em 1em 1em 0; background: #f9f9f9; border: 1px #aaa  solid; border-collapse: collapse; font-size: 90%;"
|- bgcolor="#f2f2f2" 
!Student
!Song
!Result
|-
| Ikram 
| "Kekal Bahagia" (Ippo Hafiz)
| Safe 
|- 
| Jasper 
| "Pantas" (Hanie Soraya) 
| Safe 
|- 
| Afi
| "Akustatik" (OAG) 
| Safe 
|- 
| Ara 
| "Bimbang" (Goodbye Felicia) 
| Safe 
|- 
| Emy 
| ''"Dekat Tapi Jauh" (Forteen)
| Safe 
|-
| Reshma 
| "Langit Cinta" (Dayang Nurfaizah) 
| Safe 
|- 
| Amir
| "Umi" (Dato' Shake) 
| Safe 
|- 
| Riana
| "Tanpa Kekasihku" (Agnez Mo) 
| Safe 
|- 
| Rahila 
| "Cinta Sempurna" (Yuna)
| Safe 
|-
| Zarol 
| "Barakallah" (Maher Zain)
| Safe 
|- 
| Asha 
| "Syurga" (Datin Alyah) 
| Safe
|-  
| Amal 
| "Hang Pi Mana" (Khalifah)
| Safe 
|- 
|} 
 Eliminated: No elimination.

Week 5
 Aired date: 18 September 2016 
 Theme: Tribute / Idol 
 Guest judges: Dato' Jamal Abdillah

 Eliminated: Jasper James Supayah (Jasper), Isyariana binti Che Azmi (Riana) & Zahrul Hilmi bin Badrul Hisam (Emy) 
Jasper, Riana and Emy were announced as eliminated students this week. However, they were eliminated at the beginning of the concert before they could perform. 

Week 6
 Aired date: 25 September 2016 Theme: Medley
 Guest judges: Ogy Dato' Ahmad Daud]]
 
 Eliminated: Muhammad Ikram bin Kamaruzzaman (Ikram) & Siti Aisyah binti Abdul Razak (Asha)

Week 7 (semi-final)
 Aired date: 2 October 2016
 Guest judges: Kudsia Kahar 
Solo
 

Duet
 
 Eliminated: Mohammad Afzarul Dzarif bin Mohammad Mazlee (Zarol) & Nur Rahila binti Rashun (Rahila)

Week 8 (final)
 Aired date: 9 October 2016
 Guest judges: Dato' M. Nasir
 
 Champion: Amir Syazwan bin Masdi (Amir) 
 Runner-up: Muhammad Ammal Shafiq bin Osman (Amal) 
 Third place: Kareshma Martin John Patrick (Reshma) 
 Fourth place: Nur Farrah Izzatie binti Johari (Ara) 
 Fifth place: Nurhafizah binti Longkip @ Thomas (Afi)

Elimination

Elimination chart

Cast members

Host AF Concerts
 Zizan Razak 
 Alif Satar

Host AF Diary
 Dahlia Shazwan 
 Hazeman Huzir
 CK Faizal

Host Terlajak AF
 Dato' Aliff Syukri Kamarzaman 
 CK Faizal

Professional Trainers
 Dato' Shake (Principal) 
 Edry Abdul Halim (Concerts Music Director) 
 Mas Idayu (Performance Arts) 
 Linda Jasmine (Choreographer) 
 Ellie Suriati (Presentation) 
 Shahrol (Vocal) 
 Dato' Aliff Syukri Kamarzaman (Motivator & Fashion Advisor) 
 Coach Cem (Diet & Nutrition Advisor)

Judges
 Dato' Ramli M.S
 Dato' AC Mizal

Season statistics

References

Akademi Fantasia seasons
2016 Malaysian television seasons